Hemoglobin A3 is a predominantly historic term for a fraction of normal hemoglobin molecules that is seen when hemoglobin is separated out using starch block electrophoresis. These Hemoglobin molecules are non-enzymatic modifications of the hemoglobin molecules and they encompass hemoglobinA1c, Hb1a (both the subtypes Hb1a1 and Hb1a2) and Hb1b.

As these Hemoglobin subtypes are formed over time, they are found more prevalent in older red cells.

See also 
 Hemoglobin

References

Hemoglobins